Ash Crow -  is an album by Susumu Hirasawa.

Overview
Ash Crow contains a series of compositions written by Susumu Hirasawa for adaptations of the manga Berserk. Tied to the 2016 TV adaptation, the album includes both insert songs made for it, with the title track being a previously unannounced alternative arrangement. Besides those, the album contains both original versions of various tracks and re-recordings with new arrangements, as well as some instrumental mixes of recent songs.

It contains both tracks from the 2012 "Aria" single. The presence of "Sign" marks the second time the track has appeared in a compilation, after 2007's Music for Movies.

Track listing

Personnel
Susumu Hirasawa - Vocals, Guitar, Keyboards, Personal computer, Digital audio workstation, Synthesizers, Sampler, Sequencer, Programming, Production
Masanori Chinzei - Recording, Mixing, Mastering
Toshifumi Nakai - Design
Syotaro Takami - Translation
 - Licensor (4-5)
 - Licensor (9)

Chart performance

References

External links
official English page

Susumu Hirasawa albums
2016 compilation albums
2016 remix albums
2016 soundtrack albums
Anime soundtracks